John Fox Potter nicknamed "Bowie Knife Potter" (May 11, 1817May 18, 1899) was a nineteenth-century politician, lawyer and judge from Wisconsin who served in the Wisconsin State Assembly and the U.S. House of Representatives.

Early and family life
Born in Augusta in Massachusetts' District of Maine, Potter attended common schools and Phillips Exeter Academy.  He married Frances Elizabeth Lewis Fox Potter (1818–1863) of Portland, Maine. Her father George Fox (1791–1864) and unmarried sisters would move to Wisconsin and farm alongside the Potters. Their son John Kendall Potter (1853–1864) barely survived his mother. However, their children Rebecca (1841–1908), Alfred (1843–1915) and Frances (1847–after 1900) did survive and have children.

Career

Admitted to the Wisconsin bar in 1837, Potter began his legal practice in East Troy. He served as a judge in Walworth County from 1842 to 1846.

A Whig, Potter was elected a member of the Wisconsin State Assembly, and served a term (1856–1857). He was a delegate to the 1852 Whig National Convention and 1856 Whig National Convention. With the demise of the Whig party, Potter became a Republican and became a delegate to the Republican National Convention in 1860 and 1864.

Member of Congress
Wisconsin voters elected Potter to the United States House of Representatives in 1856 and he won re-election twice. Thus, Potter served in the 35th through the 37th Congresses (1857 to 1863). Potter received his nickname in 1860, as a result of an aborted duel with Virginia Congressman Roger A. Pryor after Illinois Congressman (and abolitionist) Owen Lovejoy's remarks concerning the 1837 murder of his brother Elijah Lovejoy. Pryor had edited Potter's follow-up remarks to eliminate a mention of the Republican Party, to which Potter had objected, then Pryor challenged Potter to a duel, but his seconds objected when Potter chose bowie knives as the prospective weapon, decrying his selection of weapon as "vulgar, barbarous, and inhuman." The incident received considerable press, and Potter's friends afterward often accompanied him when on Washington's streets, lest he be accosted again to test his mettle. Potter served as chairman of the Committee on Revolutionary Pensions from 1859 to 1861 and of the Committee on Public Lands from 1861 to 1863. In this latter role, his committee handled the Homestead Act of 1862.  He was condsidered one of the "Radical Republicans" due to his support for African-American civil rights and the belief that not only should slavery not be allowed to expand, but that it should be banned in states where it currently existed.

In 1861, Potter was one of the participants in the Peace Conference of 1861, which failed to avert the American Civil War. He was defeated in his race for reelection in 1862 by fellow Maine-born lawyer James S. Brown, a Democrat who had been Milwaukee prosecutor and mayor, and who would be defeated the following year by a Republican general. During the campaign, his son Alfred C. Potter had enlisted in the 28th Wisconsin Infantry Regiment in August 1862 as a sergeant, but would be mustered out the following April, and began receiving a pension in 1896.

Later career

After Potter's congressional term ended in early 1863, he declined appointment as governor of Dakota Territory, and his wife died in May 1863 in Washington, D.C., leaving Potter a widower with a ten year old son. The Lincoln administration then appointed Potter as Consul General of the United States in the British-controlled Province of Canada from 1863 to 1866. Thus Potter resided in what was then the Canadian capital of Montreal, Lower Canada.

In 1866, Potter returned to East Troy, Wisconsin, where he resumed his legal practice.

Death and legacy

Potter died at his home on May 18, 1899. He was interred beside his wife in the family plot at Oak Ridge Cemetery in East Troy. The Wisconsin Historical Society received his knife.

References

External links

1817 births
1899 deaths
19th-century American diplomats
Republican Party members of the Wisconsin State Assembly
Politicians from Augusta, Maine
People of Wisconsin in the American Civil War
Phillips Exeter Academy alumni
Wisconsin lawyers
Wisconsin state court judges
Wisconsin Whigs
Republican Party members of the United States House of Representatives from Wisconsin
19th-century American politicians
People from East Troy, Wisconsin
19th-century American judges
19th-century American lawyers